Estación Pichilemu, also known as the Estación de Ferrocarriles de Pichilemu was a railway station in Pichilemu, Chile. It is a wood construction dated c. 1925, located in front of the Petrel Lake, near Daniel Ortúzar Avenue. It remained in operation until the 1990s, and became a National Monument on September 16, 1994. It has since become an arts and culture center, and tourism information office. It exhibits decorative and practical objects from the 1920s, and features many old suits.

History 
 of railway line were constructed in the O'Higgins Region, but only  still exists. The  San Fernando–Pichilemu section was constructed over a period of 57 years between 1869 and 1926. Passenger services operated on the line until 1986 and freight services were operational until 1995.

In 2006, the Peralillo–Pichilemu section was removed completely.

References

External links

National Monuments of Chile in Pichilemu
Buildings and structures in Pichilemu
Railway stations in Chile
Transport infrastructure completed in 1925
National Monuments of Chile
Railway stations opened in 1926